Kangati Sreedevi is an Indian politician. She was elected to the Andhra Pradesh Legislative Assembly from Pattikonda as a member of the YSR Congress Party. Her husband was murdered.

References

YSR Congress Party politicians
Living people
Year of birth missing (living people)
Andhra Pradesh MLAs 2019–2024